During the 1951–52 Scottish football season, Celtic competed in Scottish Division A. They finished the season in 9th place with 28 points.

Results

Scottish Division A

Scottish Cup

Scottish League Cup

References

Celtic F.C. seasons
Celtic